Beard v. United States, 158 U.S. 550 (1895), is a United States Supreme Court case in which self-defense in a homicide case was found not to require a duty to retreat.

References

External links
 

1895 in United States case law
United States Supreme Court cases
United States Supreme Court cases of the Fuller Court